Yoo Yang-Joon  (born September 22, 1985) is a South Korean football player who since 2008 has played for Suwon Samsung Bluewings. He had only one match at Korean League Cup

References

External links

1985 births
Living people
South Korean footballers
Suwon Samsung Bluewings players
Korean Police FC (Semi-professional) players
K League 1 players
Association football defenders